Dragon's Fury is a steel spinning roller coaster opened on 27 March 2004 at Chessington World of Adventures Resort in southwest London, England. This ride has four-person cars that can be weighted evenly or with bias to one side, depending on the amount of spin desired. The general theme is "surviving the dragon's wrath".

History
Dragon's Fury  was announced at the beginning of the 2003 season to be the main attraction of the Land of the Dragons in Chessington World of Adventures Resort, which was to also open in 2004. The ride was purchased by the Tussauds Group alongside Spinball Whizzer, which was to open at Alton Towers for the 2004 season. Its custom track layout was created by John Wardley to fit in with the terrain and area at the park and features two lift hills. The steel spinning roller coaster ride opened in 2004. It was manufactured by Maurer Söhne.

In early 2015, large portions of the ride's track were dismantled in order to be filled with sand. This was to reduce noise for both park guests and nearby residents. Other sections, including its lift hills were altered to reduce noise after complaints from guests riding the Tiny Truckers attraction.

In June 2015, following an accident that left a user in critical condition on The Smiler, Dragon's Fury, along with Rattlesnake and Saw- The Ride at Thorpe Park were closed down whilst safety was being evaluated. They eventually re-opened for business.

Description

Tracks
The ride travels mainly around the perimeter of Land of the Dragons, and the ride has four-person cars that can be weighted evenly or with bias to one side, depending on the amount of spin desired. On-ride photos are available and taken at the foot of the first drop. As the car reaches the vertical turn it starts to spin. Because of the chain system it has a very loud lift hill which can be heard a bit of a way out of the land of the dragons.

Gallery

See also
Chessington World of Adventures Resort
Spinball Whizzer, a similar roller coaster at sister park Alton Towers

References

External links

2004 establishments in England
Roller coasters operated by Merlin Entertainments
Roller coasters introduced in 2004
Chessington World of Adventures rides
Roller coasters in the United Kingdom